Pamela Love is an American jewelry designer based in New York City.

Biography 
Pamela Love was born in New York and grew up in South Florida. After receiving her Bachelor of Fine Arts in Experimental Film and Art Direction from New York University’s Tisch School of the Arts, Love worked as a stylist and art director for film, fashion, and music video shoots  before designing jewelry as a full-time profession. She worked as a painting assistant under Italian American artist Francesco Clemente from 2005 to 2010, and began creating her own jewelry in 2007. In May 2012 she married illustrator and musician Matthew Jameson Nelson Love.

Pamela Love 
In 2007 Love began making jewelry in her apartment in Brooklyn.

Pamela Love launched her eponymous jewelry line in 2008 from her Brooklyn home. In 2009, she moved to a studio in Manhattan's Garment District and began production on a larger scale. All of her jewelry production is done in-house, and she uses sustainable methods whenever possible.

Her work is inspired by astronomy, astrology, alchemy, botany, the American South West and New York City architecture, folklore. She incorporates traditional tribal artisan patterns from New Africa, medieval European iconography and Mexican folk art.

Awards and Collaborations 
2010:
Finalist in the CFDA/Vogue Fashion Fund

2011:
 Nominee for the CFDA Swarovski Award for Accessory Design 
 Runner up for the CFDA/ Vogue Fashion Fund  
 Won the Ecco Domani Fashion Fund Award

2012:
 Nominee for the CFDA Swarovski Award for Accessory Design 
 Won the CFDA Lexus Eco Challenge for Sustainable Design

2013:
 Won the CFDA Swarovski Award for Accessory Design

Bibliography 
In 2016 Love published her book Pamela Love: Muses and Manifestations.

External links 
 Pamela Love NYC website

References

American jewelry designers
Artists from New York City
Living people
1982 births
Tisch School of the Arts alumni
Women jewellers